The island of Makira (also known as San Cristobal and San Cristóbal) is the largest island of Makira-Ulawa Province in the Solomon Islands. It is third most populous island after Malaita and Guadalcanal, with a population of 55,126 as of 2020. The island is located east of Guadalcanal and south of Malaita. The largest and capital city is Kirakira.

History 
The first recorded sighting by Europeans of Makira was by the Spanish expedition of Álvaro de Mendaña in June 1568. More precisely the sighting and also landing in San Cristobal was due to a local voyage that set out from Guadalcanal in a small boat, in the accounts the brigantine Santiago, commanded by Alférez Hernando Enriquez and having Hernán Gallego as pilot. They charted it as San Cristóbal.

Education 

Environment
A 182,550 ha tract of largely forested land encompassing the eastern part of the island has been identified by BirdLife International as an Important Bird Area (IBA) because it supports populations of several threatened or endemic bird species. The site extends from the rocky cliffs of the coast to the island's central Bauro Highlands, including the catchments of the Warihito and Raro Rivers, reaching an altitude of 1,200 m, and consisting largely of tropical rainforest. The landscape is rugged, with steep-sided valleys, many streams and waterfalls, and small perched floodplains. Potential threats to the environment are logging, invasive species and human population growth.

Birds
Significant birds include Melanesian scrubfowl, yellow-legged pigeons, crested cuckoo-doves, red-knobbed and chestnut-bellied imperial pigeons, white-headed fruit doves, Makira boobooks, pied goshawks, Sanford's sea eagles, San Cristobal dwarf kingfishers, Meek's and duchess lorikeets, yellow-bibbed lories, green pygmy-parrots, Makira honeyeaters, sooty myzomelas, long-tailed trillers, dusky fantails, Makira flycatchers, white-collared and Makira monarchs, island leaf-warblers, shade bush warblers, grey-throated white-eyes, Makira starlings, Makira thrushes and mottled flowerpeckers. The Makira woodhen, or moorhen, has not been seen since 1953; the thick-billed ground dove has not been recorded since 1927 and is presumed extinct.

Other biota
Five species of restricted-range bats have been recorded, as well as a possibly new species of giant rat (Solomys). There are two species of endemic fig (Ficus).

Notable people 

 Doreen Kuper - former Honorary Consul to New Zealand.

Gallery

References

External links
 

Islands of the Solomon Islands
Important Bird Areas of the Solomon Islands